Mordellistena bihamata is a species of beetle in the family Mordellidae. It is in the genus Mordellistena. It was described in 1846 by Frederick Valentine Melsheimer.

References

bihamata
Beetles described in 1846